"Almost Over You" is a 1983 single by Scottish singer Sheena Easton from her Best Kept Secret LP. It was written by  Jennifer Kimball and Cindy Richardson. The single reached number 25 on the Billboard Hot 100, while its Adult Contemporary peak was number 4.  In Canada, the song reached number 35 and number one on the Adult Contemporary chart.

Background
The lyrics tells of a woman who almost overcame the pain, misery, and shattered dreams her former lover gave to her, which suggests the title.

Charts

Cover versions
In 1997, country singer Lila McCann covered the song for her debut album Lila. It was released as the album's third single in 1998 and reached number 42 on the Billboard Hot Country Songs chart. 
Two Filipino singers revived this song: first is Janno Gibbs in 1999, second is Karylle in 2009.

References

External links
 

1980s ballads
1983 songs
1983 singles
1998 singles
Sheena Easton songs
Lila McCann songs
EMI Records singles
Asylum Records singles
Songs written by Jennifer Kimball
Pop ballads
Torch songs